Macrocoma haiensis is a species of leaf beetle of Morocco, described by Louis Kocher in 1967.

References

haiensis
Beetles of North Africa
Beetles described in 1967
Endemic fauna of Morocco